This article is a list of King's and Queen's commissioners of the province of North Brabant, Netherlands.

List of King's and Queen's commissioners of North Brabant
For full list, see List of King's and Queen's commissioners of North Brabant .

See also
 King's commissioner
 North Brabant

References

North Brabant